Krukt is a genus of spiders in the family Zoropsidae. It was first described in 2005 by Raven & Stumkat. , it contains 5 species, all found in Queensland.

References

Zoropsidae
Araneomorphae genera
Spiders of Australia